John Maxwell Irvine (28 February 1939 – 24 March 2012) was a British theoretical physicist and university administrator, who served as Vice-Chancellor of the University of Birmingham and the Principal and Vice-Chancellor of the Aberdeen.

Maxwell Irvine became Professor of Theoretical Physics at Manchester University in 1983 and Dean of Science at Manchester in 1989.  Irvine was Vice-Chancellor of the University of Aberdeen from 1991 to 1996. He was Vice-Chancellor of Birmingham University from 1996 to 2001. Irvine served as chairman of the nuclear physics committee of the Science Research Council and vice-president of the Institute of Physics. He was a director of the Public Health Laboratory Service. During the 1997 general election campaign, while he was Vice-Chancellor of Birmingham University, Irvine introduced Tony Blair before his keynote "education, education, education" speech. However three years later Irvine  published an open letter to Prime Minister Blair, criticising the government's policies towards universities. Irvine married Grace Ritchie in 1962 and had a son. His hobby was hill-walking.

References

External links
The Scotsman Obituary 2012

1939 births
2012 deaths
Principals of the University of Aberdeen
Vice-Chancellors of the University of Birmingham
Academics of the Victoria University of Manchester
British physicists